Niger, officially the Republic of Niger, is a landlocked country in Western Africa, named after the Niger River. It borders Nigeria and Benin to the south, Burkina Faso and Mali to the west, Algeria and Libya to the north and Chad to the east. The economy of Niger centers on subsistence crops, livestock, and some of the world's largest uranium deposits. Drought cycles, desertification, a 2.9% population growth rate, and the drop in world demand for uranium have undercut the economy.

Notable firms 
This list includes notable companies with primary headquarters located in the country. The industry and sector follow the Industry Classification Benchmark taxonomy. Organizations which have ceased operations are included and noted as defunct.

See also
 List of airlines of Niger
 List of banks in Niger
 List of hospitals in Niger

References

Companies of Niger
Economy of Niger
 
Niger